The 1977 Houston Cougars football team represented the University of Houston during the 1977 NCAA Division I football season. The Cougars were led by 16th-year head coach Bill Yeoman and played their home games at the Astrodome in Houston, Texas. The team competed as members of the Southwest Conference, in their second year as full members of the league, finishing in fourth.

Schedule

Sources:

References

Houston
Houston Cougars football seasons
Houston Cougars football